is a Japanese manga series by Öyster. It was serialized in Futabasha's seinen manga magazine Comic High! between 2012 and 2015. It was also serialized in Futabasha's Monthly Action magazine in 2015. It was collected in four tankōbon volumes. A sequel series titled  began serialization online via Nico Nico Seiga in 2017. It has been collected into six tankōbon volumes. An anime television series adaptation by Studio A-Cat aired from April 6 to June 22, 2019.

Plot
Haruto Bouida, is a hard-core otaku who has no interest in women in the three-dimension world (reality). One day, he purchases a bishoujo figure of Nona, the heroine of his favorite anime. But Nona, who should be just a figure, suddenly starts moving! A comedic married-like life between a human and a machine (?) begins!

Characters

Media

Manga

Over Drive Girl 1/6

Over Drive Girls

Anime
An anime television series adaptation of the original series was announced on the first volume of Over Drive Girls on September 12, 2018. The series is animated by Studio A-Cat and directed by Keitaro Motonaga, with Chabo Higurashi handling series composition, and Hidekazu Ebina designing the characters. It aired from April 6 to June 22, 2019, on AT-X and Tokyo MX's FutabAnime time slot. AŌP performed the series' opening theme song "Soreyuke! Koigokoro", while Haruka Tojo performed the series' ending theme song "ONE".

References

2019 anime television series debuts
Anime series based on manga
AT-X (TV network) original programming
Futabasha manga
Japanese webcomics
Kadokawa Dwango franchises
Seinen manga
Studio A-Cat
Webcomics in print